Brandon Williams (born November 22, 1999) is an American professional basketball player for the College Park Skyhawks of the NBA G League. He played college basketball for the Arizona Wildcats.

High school career
Williams attended Crespi Carmelite High School in Encino, California, where he was a four-star recruit and committed to playing college basketball for Arizona in May 2018.

College career
Williams played the 2018–19 season for the Wildcats, averaging 11.4 points per game and earning honorable mention Pac-12 Conference All-Freshman team honors. He had knee surgery in 2019, missing what would have been his sophomore season. He left Arizona in 2020 to heal and to prepare for his eventual professional career.

Professional career

Portland Trail Blazers / Westchester Knicks (2021)
After going undrafted in the 2021 NBA draft, Williams joined the Westchester Knicks of the NBA G League in October 2021. He averaged 17.7 points, 4 rebounds and 4.7 assists per game in 10 games. 

On December 26, 2021, the Portland Trail Blazers of the National Basketball Association (NBA) signed Williams to a 10-day contract to fill out the roster after several players were lost due to COVID-19 health and safety protocols.

On January 5, 2022, Williams was reacquired by the Westchester Knicks. On January 22, he scored a career-high 35 points and had eight assists in a 142–117 loss to the Maine Celtics.

On February 22, 2022, Williams signed a two-way contract with the Portland Trail Blazers. He was waived on October 7.

College Park Skyhawks (2022–present)
On November 4, 2022, Williams was named to the opening night roster for the College Park Skyhawks.

Career statistics

NBA

|-
| style="text-align:left;"| 
| style="text-align:left;"| Portland
| 24 || 16 || 26.7 || .372 || .292 || .701 || 3.1 || 3.9 || 1.0 || .4 || 12.9
|- class="sortbottom"
| style="text-align:center;" colspan="2"| Career
| 24 || 16 || 26.7 || .372 || .292 || .701 || 3.1 || 3.9 || 1.0 || .4 || 12.9

College

|-
| style="text-align:left;"| 2018–19
| style="text-align:left;"| Arizona
| 26 || 21 || 28.2 || .377 || .316 || .819 || 2.8 || 3.4 || .8 || .2 || 11.4
|-
| style="text-align:left;"| 2019–20
| style="text-align:left;"| Arizona
| style="text-align:center;" colspan="11"|  Redshirt

References

External links
Arizona Wildcats bio
College stats @ sports-reference.com

1999 births
Living people
American men's basketball players
Arizona Wildcats men's basketball players
Basketball players from Los Angeles
People from Encino, Los Angeles
Point guards
Portland Trail Blazers players
Undrafted National Basketball Association players
Westchester Knicks players